Phyllodes staudingeri is a moth in the family Erebidae first described by Georg Semper in 1901. It is found in Sumatra, Borneo, Java, the Philippines and New Guinea.

External links

Calpinae
Moths of Borneo
Moths of Sumatra
Moths described in 1901